David Gill (born 1966) is a German civil servant and politician, since October 2017 serving as German Consul General in New York. Previously, he had been Secretary of State and head of the Bundespräsidialamt, the administration of the President of Germany. He was appointed on 19 March 2012 by President Joachim Gauck and stayed in office until February 2017. He is a member of the Social Democratic Party of Germany.

He grew up in East Germany, where he initially studied theology, the only subject he was allowed to study. After the German reunification, he worked for the Federal Commissioner for the Stasi Records and became a close aide of Joachim Gauck, serving as his press secretary. In 1991, he was one of six individuals, one of them also being Gauck, who were awarded the Theodor Heuss medal by the Theodor Heuss Foundation, on behalf of the peaceful protesters of 1989 in then-East Germany.

In 1992, he left the Federal Commissioner's office to study law, and earned an LL.M. at the University of Pennsylvania in 1998. In 2000, he passed the second state examination, qualifying as a lawyer. He then worked as an adviser to the Federal Ministry of the Interior. From 2004, he worked for the Evangelical Church in Germany.

Following Gauck's nomination for President of Germany, Gill became head of his transition team and the designated head of the Bundespräsidialamt. Gill was head of the Bundespräsidialamt, in the rank of state secretary, until the end of Gauck's tenure in February 2017. His successor was Stephan Steinlein.

He is married to Sheila Gill, an American. They have two daughters.

Publications 
 (with Ulrich Schröter): Das Ministerium für Staatssicherheit: Anatomie des Mielke-Imperiums. Berlin: Rowohlt 1991 ; Taschenbuch (rororo 9369) 1993 
 Best Practice - Bericht aus der Praxis eines Informationsbeauftragten, in: Bettina Sokol (Hrsg.): Sommersymposium Informationsfreiheit Düsseldorf 2004, S. 51-69 Volltext

Weblink 
David Gill's CV on the website of the German Missions in the United States

References 

21st-century German lawyers
Living people
1966 births
East German people